Laurence Henderson Ogilvie (31 May 1877 – 18 January 1927) was  a former Australian rules footballer who played with Melbourne in the Victorian Football League (VFL).

References

External links 		
		

DemonWiki profile

1877 births
1927 deaths
VFL/AFL players born outside Australia
Australian rules footballers from Melbourne
Melbourne Football Club players
People educated at Scotch College, Melbourne
Williamstown Football Club players
Sportspeople from Fife
People from Kincardine, Fife
Scottish emigrants to colonial Australia
Scottish players of Australian rules football
People from Williamstown, Victoria